"Blow Ya Mind" is a song by American hip hop recording artist Styles P, featuring vocals and production from Swizz Beatz. The song, taken from his third studio album Super Gangster (Extraordinary Gentleman), was released October 9, 2007 as the album's lead single. "Blow Ya Mind" is considered to be the sequel to his 2002 debut single "Good Times" which was also produced by Swizz Beatz.

Music video
The music video was directed by Todd Angkasuwan and Styles P. Cameo appearances in the video are made by Idris Elba and fellow D-Block member Sheek Louch. In the video Styles P is sitting on a bench and starts having hallucinations.

Remix
The official remix features Swizz Beatz, along with Styles P's D-Block cohorts Jadakiss and Sheek Louch. The remix appears in the video game Grand Theft Auto IV.

Chart
The song peaked at number 19 on the Billboard Hot Rap Tracks chart, and number 51 on the Hot R&B/Hip-Hop Songs chart.

References

Styles P songs
Swizz Beatz songs
Song recordings produced by Swizz Beatz
Songs written by Swizz Beatz
Songs about cannabis
Ruff Ryders Entertainment singles
MNRK Music Group singles